Jon Mauno Korhonen (born 5 January 1987 in Helsinki, Finland) is a Finnish rapper of Nigerian origin.

Born in Helsinki, he lived in the city's Kruununhaka and Pihlajamäki neighborhoods, performing from the early 2000s. In 2005 he appeared as Juno in a TV reality show called Rap SM in the Finnish language rap section of the show. The other rappers in the Finnish leg were Kajo and Ruudolf.

Juno joining various successful formations. Juno was first in the duo Hulabaloo with Mr. KO using hip hop, rap and electro influences. Signed to 3rd Rail Music record label, the duo released the album Sirkusteltta in 2008.

But he also continued his solo efforts in 2008 releasing 10 December 2008 his debut solo album 13 on Yellowmic Records that was produced by Sakke Aalto. In the summer of 2009, he also released his own EP Kettoteippi

In 2009, he became part of the four-member hip hop band SMC Lähiörotat alongside Avionin Prinssi, Erä-Koira and Thono Slowknow. The band had immediate success particularly with the 2009 hit / music video "SMC Hoodrats".

Meanwhile, he also continued posting his own materials like "Suomileffas" (with McVilleGalle) and "Äänitorvia" (with Kosola) and notably his second studio album V-Tyyli on 27 January 2010 with Monsp Records followed by J.K x 2 Tunti terapiaa on 13 October 2010. Notable singles included "Pelotteluu" and "Yks risti kaks".

The band SMC Lähiörotat released their 2011 album Raffii Suomi-flättii. The album peaked at number 2 on The Official Finnish Charts in June 2011. Singles included title track "Raffii Suomi-flättii" with Asa, HenryWho? & Ameeba. Other collaborations included Notkea Rotta, Jodarok, Aqustiikka, Raimo etc. An accompanying DVD was also marketed with the album.

Juno's third major cooperation was in the Finnish rap / reggae / folk formation Elokuu that started in 2011 as a trio including Juno, Nopsajalka and Jonas W. Karlsson. Elokuu has had considerable success with its 2012 album Hääväki saapuu which reached number two on The Official Finnish Charts Hit singles included the very successful "Soutaa huopaa" (number 2 in charts) and "Saatilla"

Juno is now working on his fourth studio album to be released in April 2013 titled 050187 while still contributing to the Elokuu project.

Juno also regularly contributes to Parasta buddhaa (Best of Buddha) project run by Green Buddha Records with several tracks in both Parasta buddhaa (2010) and Parasta buddhaa 2 (2012). Green Buddha Records (GBR) has assembled a great number of hip hop artists that besides Juno included Matinpoika, McVilleKalle, Jare, Ama-T, Elia, Sam the Mään a.k.a. Okku, Dj Ink, DJ Double M, Anselmi Oksman and Antti "Kopa" Kosonen

Juno Discography

Albums
Juno solo

EPs
Juno solo

Singles

Discography (various Juno bands)

Albums
as part of Hulabaloo

as part of SMC Lähiörotat

as part of Elokuu

featured with Green Buddha Records

Singles
as part of Elokuu

References

Finnish rappers
1987 births
Living people
Finnish people of Kenyan descent